By some optimistic estimates, there are as many as 130 castles in Luxembourg but more realistically there are probably just over a hundred, although many of these could be considered large residences or manor houses rather than castles.

The present list of castles in Luxembourg runs to about 50 and includes all the well-known fortresses and residential chateaux in the country. Below the main list, there is a sublist mentioning some of the other castles which may be included at a later date.

Main list

Sublist
This is a list of less important castles or castles which are not yet covered by articles in the English Wikipedia.
 
Belenhaff in Junglinster (converted to a golf course and clubhouse)
Berlaymont Castle in Clervaux (small 12th-century castle rebuilt 1635, now a hotel)
Birtrange Castle near Schieren (privately owned) 
Ell Castle near Redange (once a minor fort, now used for agricultural activities)
Heringen in the Mullerthal (an unimpressive ruin)
Kockelscheuer Castle just south of Luxembourg City (19th century private residence) 
Mertert Castle near Wasserbillig (built in the 1870s, offers accommodation)
Moestroff Castle near Bettendorf in eastern Luxembourg (dates from 1433, privately owned) 
Schorels Castle near Eschette (only remnants of walls remain)  
Schrassig Castle, now demolished dated from the 17th century
Syrdall Castle

References

External links

List of castles in Luxembourg
Luxembourg
Castles in Luxembourg
Lists of castles by country
Castles